Beach Road is a coastal suburban road in Melbourne, Australia that runs along the northeastern shore of Melbourne's Port Phillip Bay, starting at the T-junction with Beacon Street in Port Melbourne to its southern end at the junction with Nepean Highway in Mordialloc.

While only the road's southern half beyond the South Road junction is actually named "Beach Road", the name covers many consecutive street sections and this is not widely known to most drivers, as the entire allocation is still best known as by the respective names of its constituent parts: Beach Street, Beaconsfield Parade, Jacka Boulevard, Marine Parade, Ormond Esplanade, St Kilda Street, Esplanade and Beach Road proper. This article will deal with the entire length of the corridor for sake of completion, as well to avoid confusion between declarations.

Beach Road is extremely popular with cyclists.  While the Bayside Trail follows the road closely, cyclists with racing bicycles usually use the road itself.  According to Bicycle Victoria, over 7,000 riders were recorded using the road on one Saturday in September 2008 .  Numerous cycling clubs and less formal groups use the road for training sessions for road racing and triathlon.  Cycling advocacy groups are presently campaigning for the removal of on-street parking on weekend mornings. Beach Road has also been the subject of a local council and community campaign to limit truck traffic.

Route
Beach Road starts as Beach Street at the T-junction with Beacon Street in Port Melbourne (just northwest of Princes Pier) and heads southeast as a dual carriageway road, changing name to Beaconsfield Parade after  (at the junction with Esplanade East near the Port Melbourne Life Saving Club) and running along the foreshore of the beach along Port Phillip Bay for the next . At the intersection with Fitzroy Street at St Kilda, it changes name to Jacka Boulevard and runs past the St Kilda Sea Baths and southern edge of Luna Park, where it changes name again to Marine Parade, still following the coast. It intersects with Barkly Street and Glen Huntly Road just east of Point Ormond, changing name to Ormond Esplanade, and narrowing to a four-lane single carriageway. At the northern edge of Brighton it intersects with and changes name to St. Kilda Street, running south through the suburbs of western Brighton, rejoining the coast outside Royal Brighton Yacht Club and changing name again to the Esplanade after the junction with the minor Grosvenor Street. It continues further south along the coast until the Y-junction with South Road just outside Brighton Beach railway station, where it changes name for the final time as Beach Road, running along the beaches through Sandringham, Black Rock and Mentone before eventually terminating at Nepean Highway at Mordialloc.

History
The Country Roads Board (later VicRoads) declared Beach Road (its original allocation, from South Road in southern Brighton to Mordialloc) a Main Road in May 1935.  In the 1959/60 financial year, its northern section was declared a Main Road (as Beach Road), from Bay Street in Port Melbourne, along Beach Street, Beaconsfield Parade, Lower Esplande (later renamed to Jacka Boulevard), Marine Parade, Ormond Esplanade, St Kilda Street and Esplanade to Beach Road proper.

Beach Road (including all its constituent roads) was signed as Metropolitan Route 33 between Port Melbourne and Mordialloc in 1965. Metropolitan Route 26 previously ran concurrent along Beaconsfield Parade and Beach Street from Kerferd Road at Albert Park, past Bay Street at Port Melbourne eventually along Howe Parade to Williamstown Road; Metropolitan Route 26 was later truncated to terminate at Kerferd Road and Beaconsfield Parade in 1989.

The passing of the Road Management Act 2004 granted the responsibility of overall management and development of Victoria's major arterial roads to VicRoads: in 2004, VicRoads re-declared the road as Beach Road (Arterial #5840), from Bay Street to Nepean Highway, however the road is still presently known (and signposted) as its constituent parts.

See also

References

Streets in Melbourne
Port Phillip
Transport in the City of Port Phillip
Transport in the City of Bayside
Transport in the City of Kingston (Victoria)